Tarakeshwar Sengupta (15 April 1905 - 16 September 1931) was an Indian independence activist who took part in the Chittagong Armoury Raid. He was a member of revolutionary group of Masterda Surya Sen.

Early life

Sengupta was born on 15 April 1905 in Gaila village of Barisal District, British India at present Bangladesh, in a Bengali middle-class family. He was inspired with the idea of patriotism in his family environment.

Revolutionary activities

Tarakeshwar Sengupta was a social workers. He was connected with Jugantar group in the Gaila branch. He was also attached with the Sankar Math and Gaila Sevasram. Sengupta was arrested and imprisoned for a few months. He joined the Salt Satyagraha and was again arrested in D.I rule and sent to Hijli Jail.

Death
On 16 September 1931 police shot and killed Tarakeshwar Sengupta along with Santosh Kumar Mitra in Hijli Detention Camp.

References

1905 births
1931 deaths
Anti-British establishment revolutionaries from East Bengal
People from Barisal District
Indian revolutionaries
Revolutionary movement for Indian independence
Indian independence activists from Bengal
Indian independence activists from West Bengal